Edward Adam Kriwiel (September 8, 1926 – December 2, 2007) was an American football and golf coach.  A member of seven Kansas halls of fame, Kriwiel was a figurehead in state high school sports for many years.

Playing career

High school
At Tilden Tech High School, a public school in Chicago, Kriwiel was the captain of the undefeated high school football team. They won the Chicago City Championship, pitting the champions of the public school league against the champions of the private school league in front of 68,000 fans at Soldier Field.  Four of his high school teammates went on to play at Notre Dame for Frank Leahy, but it was Kriwiel who was named “Most Valuable Player” of the team.

College
Kriwiel attended the Municipal University of Wichita—now Wichita State University—in 1947, where he started for the Shockers at quarterback.  He holds several school records, and he led the Shockers to Raisin Bowl and Camellia Bowl appearances.  He was inducted into the Kansas Sports Hall of Fame in 2004.

Coaching career

Wichita State
Kriwiel was the 28th head football coach at Wichita State University and he held that position for the 1968 season, leading the Shockers to an 0–10 record.

High school football
Kriwiel was more successful at the high school ranks.  Prior to coaching at Wichita State, Kriwiel was the head coach at Wichita West High School for 14 years, leaving there with a 33-game winning streak.  After coaching in college, Kriwiel spent the rest of his career coaching football and golf and serving as the athletic director at Kapaun Mt. Carmel High School in Wichita.  Kriwiel won 297 games as a high school football coach and his teams had just two losing seasons in 36 years.  His teams played in 12 state championship games and won 9.

High school golf
Kriwiel was also highly successful as a high school golf coach at Kapaun-Mt. Carmel.  Since 1969 his teams won 20 state titles and 28 top-four finishes.  While unofficial, this is believed by many to be a national record.

Head coaching record

College

References

External links
 

1926 births
2007 deaths
American football quarterbacks
American golf instructors
Wichita State Shockers football coaches
Wichita State Shockers football players
High school football coaches in Kansas
Sportspeople from Chicago
Coaches of American football from Illinois
Players of American football from Chicago